Joselito is the name for:

First name / given name
Joselito (singer), Spanish 1950s child actor and singer
Joselito Agustin (1976–2010), also known as Aksyon Lito, Filipino journalist
Joselito Altarejos, Filipino film and television director, producer 
Joselito Pimentel, better known as Lito Pimentel, Filipino film and television actor
Joselito Vaca, Bolivian football midfielder

Known as Joselito
Jojo Duncil, real name Joselito Duncil, (born 1983), Filipino professional basketball player
José Gómez Ortega,  Joselito, Spanish matador
José Romero Jiménez,  Joselito, Spanish football forward
Lito Atienza, full name José Livioko Atienza, Jr., a.k.a. Joselito Atienza, Filipino politician, former city mayor of Manila

See also
Joselito vagabundo, 1965 Mexican film